Bubacarr Jobe (born November 21, 1994) is a Gambian footballer who currently plays for Swedish club Norrby IF.

Career 
Jobe moved to the United States in 2011, and first played for Rush Soccer alongside Vancouver Whitecaps forward Kekuta Manneh. However, he suffered an ACL injury in the opening weeks of his career in America. He scored four goals in five games during the 2012 Super-20 Championships for Force Football Club Academy, which led to him being named in the All-Tournament Team while being crowned MVP and top scorer. He totalled 10 goals in 27 games for Texas Rush.

Jobe was also named 2014 Montgomery County Player of the Year, having broken the Woodlands High School record with 31 goals in a single season. He later lined-up for Premier Development League side Austin Aztex, where he recorded a prolific rate of seven goals in 12 games.

In 2014, he made a single appearance for Chicago Fire Reserves in the USL while on a three-day trial, and scored the only goal in a 1-0 win over Montreal Impact Reserves.

Jobe later signed for Toronto FC II in August 2015, and made his debut in a 2-1 win over Richmond Kickers on August 15, 2015.

International goals
Scores and results list Gambia's goal tally first.

Personal 
Upon his arrival to the United States, Jobe moved in with Rush Soccer CEO Don Gemmell and his wife Brooke Gemmell. They officially adopted him in 2013, after a number of cultural differences had been overcome by Jobe.

References

External links 
 

1994 births
Living people
Association football midfielders
Gambian footballers
Gambian expatriate footballers
The Gambia international footballers
Toronto FC II players
Skövde AIK players
Mjällby AIF players
Örgryte IS players
USL Championship players
Superettan players
Ettan Fotboll players
Gambian expatriate sportspeople in Canada
Gambian expatriate sportspeople in Sweden
Expatriate soccer players in Canada
Expatriate footballers in Sweden
2021 Africa Cup of Nations players